George V. Harvie (born c. 1951) is a Canadian politician, currently serving as mayor of the City of Delta, British Columbia since 2018. His mayorship followed nearly twenty years as Delta's Chief Administration Officer (CAO) from 2001 to 2018. Previously, Harvie served in several positions over 30 years at the City of Burnaby, including Deputy City Manager.

Early life
Born in Vancouver, Harvie grew up in Burnaby, British Columbia. Upon getting married, he moved to Delta around 1976. 

Harvie was educated at Simon Fraser University, where he earned a B.A. in Economics. He also holds an Administrative Management Special Certificate and an Environmental Health Diploma of Technology from the British Columbia Institute of Technology, and studied Advanced Management at Dalhousie University.

Career
Beginning in the late 1970s, Harvie worked for the City of Burnaby where he served as Deputy City Manager, Director of Human Resources, and Manager of the Environmental Health Department.

Harvie was chief public health inspector in Burnaby during the 1980s, and later became the city's deputy manager, and was also the city's director of human resources. Harvie served as Delta's chief administration officer (CAO) from 2001 to 2018. As CAO, he was in charge of about 1000 municipal employees.

In 2012, Harvie was awarded a Queen Elizabeth II Diamond Jubilee Medal for helping to secure funding for nine major infrastructure projects for Delta.

After serving nearly twenty years as Delta’s City Manager, Harvie officially resigned as CAO in May 2018 when he announced his plans to run for mayor in the 2018 mayoral election for the "Achieving for Delta" slate, a new party which was named for Harvie's "past achievements" as CAO as well as his party's "future achievements".

Municipal Politics

Election 2018 
On May 22, 2018, Harvie officially declared his candidacy for mayor of Delta and announced his Achieving for Delta slate of candidates. Harvie’s running mates included former fire chief Dan Copeland, entrepreneur and social advocate Param Grewal, farmer and local business owner Alicia Guichon, Dylan Kruger, who brought governing experience at the provincial and federal levels and former police officer Cal Traversy.

Harvie and Achieving for Delta’s priorities included keeping taxes low and Delta debt-free, investing in parks and recreation facilities, investing in police and fire departments, approving more housing choices in town centres, and taking action to protect green space and preserve agricultural land.

In early September 2018, Harvie added four school board trustee candidates to his Achieving for Delta slate along with a pledge to work with the school board to upgrade facilities and strengthen education for Delta students. School board trustee candidates included registered nurse and health advocate Erica Beard, local Notary Public Daniel Boisvert, and high-performance athletic coach Jessie Dosanjh.

On October 20, 2018, Harvie was victorious in the three-way mayoral race, winning 40% of the vote, defeating former police chief Jim Cressford and city councillor Sylvia Bishop. Achieving for Delta secured a majority of seats on Council (4/6) and a near-majority on school board (3/7). Alicia Guichon, Dan Copeland, Lois Jackson, Dylan Kruger were elected to Council under the Achieving for Delta banner and Erica Beard, Daniel Boisvert, and Jessie Dosanjh were elected as School Board Trustees under the same.

Mayoral Term 
As the Mayor of Delta, Harvie moved his mandate forward on several priorities, including delivering on record investments, keeping Delta debt-free and with some of the lowest taxes in the Metro Vancouver region.

As mayor, Harvie has worked to improve livability in Delta by increasing housing options and rental supply as well as building and permitting more housing options in town centres. Initiatives to revitalize communities and town centres in Delta have been underway, such as expanding Delta’s outdoor patio program, legalizing ride-hailing, and the introduction of We Love Delta pop-up parks.

For the first time in Delta’s history, the LGBTQ+ Pride flag was raised at City Hall in June of each year of Harvie’s term.

Harvie has long been an advocate for a replacement of the George Massey Tunnel. Building a bridge over the Fraser had been planned by the BC Liberal government, but was scrapped by the British Columbia New Democratic Party when they came to power in 2017. Harvie has been “agnostic to whether it’s a bridge or a tunnel,” but has emphasized the need to replace the aging infrastructure as soon as possible. Harvie has insisted that the City’s lobbying efforts to move the project along as quickly as possible will continue.

Election 2022 
In October 2021, Harvie announced his bid for re-election as mayor of Delta in the 2022 General Election under the same Achieving for Delta banner as 2018. Achieving for Delta’s priorities include investments in parks and recreation infrastructure, keeping Delta safe, improving livability, building a fair and inclusive community, and taking real action to fight climate change and protect farmland.

On May 24, 2022, Harvie announced his full Achieving for Delta slate for Council and School Trustees. Council candidates running on Harvie’s Achieving for Delta team in 2022 include incumbent councillors Alicia Guichon and Dylan Kruger, school trustees Daniel Boisvert, Jessie Dosanjh, parks and recreation commissioner Rod Binder and local businesswoman Jennifer Johal.

Harvie has committed to working in partnership with the school board on shared priorities to maximize efficient use of tax dollars. He announced the Achieving for Delta School Trustee candidates as incumbents Erica Beard and Board Chair Val Windsor, as well as Nimmi Daula,  Dr. Ammen Dhillon, Masako Gooch, Maury Kask, and  Joe Muego.

At a campaign launch event on May 30, 2022, Harvie received an endorsement from the Delta Firefighters Union Local 1763. A week previous, longtime Delta Councillor Bruce McDonald and school trustee Laura Dixon paired their statements about their retirements from public office with endorsements of Harvie and the Achieving for Delta team.

On October 15, 2022, Harvie was re-elected as Mayor of Delta with 17,050 votes (77%), defeating mayoral candidates Peter van der Velden and Joginder Randhawa who had 3,751 votes and 1,341 votes respectively. All six of the Achieving for Delta team of Council candidates were also elected, and six of seven Achieving for Delta School Trustee candidates were elected.

References

1950s births
Living people
People from Delta, British Columbia
People from Burnaby
Politicians from Vancouver
Mayors of places in British Columbia
Canadian city managers and chief administrative officers
Simon Fraser University alumni
British Columbia Institute of Technology alumni
Dalhousie University alumni